The men's flyweight boxing competition at the Rio 2016 Summer Olympics was held from 13 to 21 August at the Riocentro.

The medals for the competition were presented by Irena Szewinska, Poland, IOC member, and the gifts were presented by Wu Ching-kuo, President of the AIBA.

Competition format
Like all Olympic boxing events, the competition was a straight single-elimination tournament. This event consisted of 26 boxers who have qualified for the competition through various qualifying tournaments held in 2015 and 2016. The competition began with a preliminary round on 13 August, where the number of competitors was reduced to 16, and concluded with the final on 21 August. As there were fewer than 32 boxers in the competition, a number of boxers received a bye through the preliminary round. Both semi-final losers were awarded bronze medals.

Schedule 
All times are Brasília Time (UTC−3).

Results

Finals

Top half

Bottom half

References

Boxing at the 2016 Summer Olympics
Men's events at the 2016 Summer Olympics